The 1964 Coppa Italia Final was the final of the 1963-64 Coppa Italia. The match was played on 6 September 1964 between Roma and Torino. Since the match ended 0–0, a replay of the final was played on 1 November 1964 in Turin, where Roma won 1–0.

Final

Replay Final

References 
Coppa Italia 1963/64 statistics at rsssf.com
 https://www.calcio.com/calendario/ita-coppa-italia-1963-1964-finale/2/
 https://www.worldfootball.net/schedule/ita-coppa-italia-1963-1964-finale/2/

Coppa Italia Finals
Coppa Italia Final 1964
Coppa Italia Final 1964